Kishavisheh, also rendered as Keshavosheh or Keshaweshah or Kasha-Veshakh or Kashavasheh, may refer to:
 Kishavisheh-ye Olya
 Kishavisheh-ye Sofla